Westland, Netherlands may refer to:

 Westland (municipality), Netherlands, a municipality of the Province of South Holland
 Westland (region), Netherlands, a region of the Province of South Holland